"Nobody Loves You (When You're Down and Out)" is a song written by John Lennon released on his 1974 album Walls and Bridges. The song is included on the 1986 compilation Menlove Ave., the 1990 boxset Lennon, the 1998 boxset John Lennon Anthology, the 2005 two-disc compilation Working Class Hero: The Definitive Lennon, and the 2010 boxset Gimme Some Truth.

Lyrics and music
Lennon wrote "Nobody Loves You (When You're Down and Out)" early in his time in Los Angeles during his separation from wife Yoko Ono, often called his "lost weekend." The song reflects his feelings of depression and loneliness during that time. Lennon recorded an acoustic demo as early as October 1973. Besides his separation from Ono, the lyrics are also influenced by Lennon's disappointment at the negative reception his recent work had received from critics and the public, and his feelings of having been cheated by the music industry. The lyrics describe the emptiness he felt as well as his disillusionment with show business. Various lines could be taken as cynical responses to Ono, or to Lennon's audience and music critics. In response to the question of whether he loves someone, the singer responds "it's all showbiz." The lyrics also seem to express resentment Lennon felt about being the one who had to awaken people to what was happening, and was still not appreciated, with lyrics about how he's "been across to the other side" and "shown you everything." Lines about crossing the water to see "one eyed witchdoctors" may refer to Lennon's disillusionment with the Maharishi. or his partial success with Arthur Janov. The song ends cynically, with the line "Everybody loves you when you're six-foot in the ground." Another line which adds to the cynicism is "I'll scratch your back and you knife mine."

Authors Ken Bielen and Ben Urish describe Lennon's voice for the song as "hoarse," claiming that the production helps give "an alienated ambiance to his lethargic (but not dull) vocal performance." They also claim that the horn section adds to the "thick musical overcast," as does Jesse Ed Davis' guitar solo, which they compare to a "howling wolf." The song changes tempo when the lyrics move from apathy to emotional outbursts.

The title comes from the 1923 blues song "Nobody Knows You When You're Down and Out," which had been covered by Eric Clapton with Derek and the Dominos in 1970.

Lennon said that "Nobody Loves You (When You're Down and Out)" was an ideal song for Frank Sinatra to sing. This likely refers to the song's lethargic tone. Rock journalist Paul Du Noyer claims "Nobody Loves You (When You're Down and Out)" has a "low key, late night feel" reminiscent of such Sinatra songs as "One for My Baby (and One More for the Road)" and "In the Wee Small Hours of the Morning."

The judge hearing the lawsuit that Morris Levy initiated against Lennon over the similarities between the Beatles' "Come Together" (written by Lennon) and Chuck Berry's "You Can't Catch Me" quoted lyrics from "Nobody Loves You (When You're Down and Out),"  claiming that the words "everybody's hustling for a buck and a dime" were an ideal introduction to the case.

Reception
Author John Blaney calls "Nobody Loves You (When You're Down and Out)" the "signature tune" of the lost weekend. Bielen and Urish claim that it "captures the essence of a three o'clock in the morning, bleary-eyed, self pitying, booze-drenched interior monologue," and that it contains "a certain bravado and grandeur...that makes the weary emptiness of the verses and the impotent rage of the refrains eloquent and poignant..." Journalist Paul Du Noyer calls it a "colossal ballad" which "sounds nothing but sincere" despite being "a sprawling testament to John's cynicism and self-pity." According to Chip Madinger and Mark Easter, Lennon had "rarely penned more honest words in his life." Pop historian Robert Rodriguez praises Jesse Ed Davis' "incredibly fluid" guitar lead.  Ultimate Classic Rock critic Nick DeRiso called the song the most underrated song on Walls and Bridges.

Other versions
The version of the song on Menlove Ave. has altered lyrics and minimal instrumentation. For example, the line on Walls and Bridges "I'll scratch your back, you knife mine" was rendered as "I'll scratch your back, you scratch mine." Author John Blaney finds that version even more melancholy than the version on Walls and Bridges, claiming that Lennon's whistling at the beginning of the song gives the version a "sense of lonely isolation" and that Jesse Ed Davis' guitar "exacts palpable moans and cries of despair." Rogan believes that the Menlove Ave. version "sounds slight" compared to the Walls and Bridges version, but still feels it makes an "interesting addendum to the Lennon catalogue."

John Lennon Anthology uses yet another version of the song, which incorporates additional musicians, including keyboards, percussion and an additional guitar.

Personnel
The musicians who performed on the original recording were as follows:

John Lennon – vocals, acoustic guitar 
Jesse Ed Davis – electric guitar
Klaus Voormann – bass
Nicky Hopkins – piano
Ken Ascher – organ
Jim Keltner – drums
Bobby Keys, Steve Madaio, Howard Johnson, Ron Aprea, Frank Vicari – horns

References

Songs about loneliness
Songs about depression
John Lennon songs
Songs written by John Lennon
1974 songs
Song recordings produced by John Lennon
Plastic Ono Band songs